Amarajeevi (1901–1952), also known as Potti Sreeramulu, was an Indian revolutionary.

Amarajeevi may also refer to:

 Amarajeevi (1965 film), a Kannada film
 Amarajeevi (1983 film), a Telugu film